John H. G. Crispo (5 May 1933 – 27 April 2009) was a Canadian economist, author and educator.

Crispo graduated with a Bachelor of Commerce from the University of Toronto and with a Doctor of Philosophy at the Massachusetts Institute of Technology.

In 2006, he became a municipal politician, the Ward 3 councillor for Clearview Township.

He became a noted supporter of the Canada-United States Free Trade Agreement.

Eighteen years after being diagnosed with prostate cancer, Crispo died at Princess Margaret Hospital, Toronto aged 75. He was active at the University of Toronto's Rotman School of Management where he was designated Professor Emeritus.

Books
 2002: Rebel Without a Pause: Memoirs of a Canadian Maverick (Warwick) 
 1992: Making Canada Work: Competing in the Global Economy, (1992, Random House) 
 1990: Can Canada Compete? (Hemlock) 
 1988: Free Trade: The Real Story (Gage) 
 1984: National consultation : problems and prospects (C. D. Howe Institute) 
 1979: Mandate For Canada (General Publishing) 
 1978: Industrial democracy in western Europe: a North American perspective (McGraw-Hill Ryerson) 
 1978: The Canadian industrial relations system (McGraw-Hill Ryerson) 
 1975: The public right to know : accountability in the secretive society (McGraw-Hill Ryerson) 
 1967: International unionism : a study in Canadian-American relations (McGraw-Hill)
 1966: (editor) Industrial relations : challenges and responses (University of Toronto Press)

References

1933 births
2009 deaths
University of Toronto alumni
Academic staff of the University of Toronto
Massachusetts Institute of Technology alumni
Canadian economists
Deaths from cancer in Ontario
Deaths from prostate cancer
People from Clearview, Ontario